The Epic is a  tall skyscraper in New York City. It was constructed from 2005 to 2007, and has 58 floors. It is tied with four other buildings, the New York Life Building, 919 Third Avenue, Tower 49, and 750 7th Avenue in its position as the 118th tallest building in New York, and has 460 rooms.

Gallery

See also
List of tallest buildings in New York City

References

Phorio
Emporis
Skyscraperpage
Building Developer Website

Residential skyscrapers in Manhattan
Residential buildings completed in 2007
Chelsea, Manhattan
2007 establishments in New York City